Kenneth James William Craik (1914 – 1945) was a Scottish philosopher and psychologist.

Life

He was born in Edinburgh on 29 March 1914, the son of James Craik, a solicitor. The family lived at 13 Abercromby Place in Edinburgh's Second New Town (previously the home of William Trotter). He was educated at Edinburgh Academy then studied philosophy at the University of Edinburgh. He received his doctorate from Cambridge University in 1940. He then had a fellowship to St John's College, Cambridge in 1941, where he worked with Magdalen Dorothea Vernon and published papers with her about dark adaptation in 1941 and 1943. He was appointed to be the first director of the Medical Research Council's Cambridge-based Applied Psychology Unit in 1944.

During the Second World War he served in the fire-fighting sections of the Civil Defence. Together with Gordon Butler Iles he made major advances on flight simulators for the RAF and did major studies on the effects of fatigue on pilots.

He died at the age of 31 following an accident, where a car struck his bicycle on the Kings Parade in Cambridge on 7 May 1945. He died in hospital on the following day: VE Day. He is buried in the northern section of Dean Cemetery. His parents Marie Sylvia Craik and James Craik were later buried with him.

The Kenneth Craik Club (an interdisciplinary seminar series in the fields of sensory science and neurobiology) and the Craik-Marshall Building in Cambridge are named in tribute to Craik. The Kenneth Craik Research Award administered by St John's College was established in his memory in 1945.

Works
In 1943 he wrote The Nature of Explanation.  In this book he first laid the foundation for the concept of mental models, that the mind forms models of reality and uses them to predict similar future events. He was thus one of the earliest practitioners of cognitive science.

In 1947 and 1948 his two-part paper on the "Theory of Human Operators in Control Systems" was published posthumously by the British Journal of Psychology.  An anthology of Craik's writings, edited by Stephen L. Sherwood, was published in 1966 as The Nature of Psychology: A Selection of Papers, Essays and Other Writings by Kenneth J. W. Craik.

See also
Intermittent control

Bibliography

Notes

Further reading

. The most substantial biographical source to date, first published in the St. John's College (Cambridge, UK) The Eagle (March 1945) and included in S.L. Sherwood's 1966 edition of Craik's writings, The Nature of Psychology.

. See especially section entitled "Cambridge and the influence of Kenneth Craik's engineering ideas" (pp. 382–383 of book; pp. 2–4 of author's self-archived PDF).

. See especially pp. 295–299 for an extended analysis of Craik, with many quotes and references.

.

. Entry reprinted verbatim from first edition (1987), pp. 169–170:

External links
 
 

1914 births
1945 deaths
Scottish psychologists
People involved with mental health
Alumni of the University of Edinburgh
Alumni of the University of Cambridge
British cognitive scientists
Fellows of St John's College, Cambridge
20th-century British psychologists
Civil Defence Service personnel